The Ecuadorian Baptist Convention is a Baptist Christian denomination in Ecuador. It is affiliated with the Baptist World Alliance. The headquarters is in Guayaquil.

History
The Ecuadorian Baptist Convention has its origins in an American mission of the International Mission Board in 1950.  It is officially founded in 1972.  According to a denomination census released in 2020, it claimed 233 churches and 22,380 members.

See also
 Bible
 Born again
 Baptist beliefs
 Worship service (evangelicalism)
 Jesus Christ
 Believers' Church

References

External links
 Official Website

Baptist denominations in South America
Baptist Christianity in Ecuador